College of Arts and Crafts may refer to:

 Akita Municipal Junior College of Arts and Crafts, Akita, Japan.
 California College of the Arts, Oakland, California, USA and San Francisco, California, USA.
 Camberwell College of Arts, London, United Kingdom.
 College of Arts and Crafts, Lucknow, Lucknow, Uttar Pradesh, India.
 College of Arts and Crafts, Patna, Patna, Bihar, India.
 Faculty of Arts and Architecture, University of Brighton, United Kingdom.
 Gaelic College of Celtic Arts and Crafts, St. Ann's, Nova Scotia's Cape Breton Island, Canada.
 Government College of Fine Arts, Chennai, Chennai, Tamil Nadu, India.
 Konstfack, University College of Arts, Crafts and Design, Stockholm, Sweden.
 Oregon College of Art & Craft, Portland, Oregon, United States.

Educational institution disambiguation pages